The name A37 is used to refer to two roads in Northern Ireland.

In the south, there is a short road in County Armagh. It connects two sections of the N53, a route in the Republic, which connects the towns of Castleblaney and Dundalk.

References

37
37
37